The Basin Reserve (commonly known as "The Basin"), is a cricket ground in Wellington, New Zealand, used for Test, first-class and one-day cricket. Some argue that its proximity to the city, its Historic Place status and its age make it the most famous cricket ground in New Zealand. The Basin Reserve is the only cricket ground in New Zealand to have Historic Place status. The ground has been used for events other than cricket, such as concerts, sports events and other social gatherings, but now it is mostly used for cricket, particularly Test matches.

Since 2023, 109 Test centuries (4 in women's cricket) have been scored at the ground, by players from every Test nation without Zimbabwe. Kiwi batsman Stewie Dempster is the first player to score a Test century. Aravinda de Silva's 267 remains the highest score at the Basin Reserve by an overseas player, scored in January 1991, while Brendon McCullum's 302 is the overall highest score both at the ground and by any New Zealand player anywhere. Martin Crowe has scored the most centuries at the ground with five.

Only six One Day International centuries have been scored at the ground. The Pakistan player Shoaib Mohammad holds the record for highest score with 126*.

Key
 * denotes that the batsman was not out.
 Inns. denotes the number of the innings in the match.
 Balls denotes the number of balls faced in an innings.
 NR denotes that the number of balls was not recorded.
 Parentheses next to the player's score denotes his century number at the Basin Reserve.
 The column title Date refers to the date the match started.
 The column title Result refers to whether the player's team won lost or if the match was drawn or a no result.

Test centuries
The following table summarises the Test centuries scored at the Basin Reserve.

One Day International centuries
The following table summarises the One Day International centuries scored at the Basin Reserve.

Women's Test centuries 
The following table summarises the Women's Test centuries scored at the Basin Reserve.

Women's One Day International centuries 
The following table summarises the Women's One Day International centuries scored at the Basin Reserve.

References

External links
 Basin Reserve at Austadiums
Quick information about the Basin Reserve.
New Zealand Cricket Museum

Basin
Cricket grounds in New Zealand
Centuries